Yeshay may refer to:
Yeshe or Yeshay, a Tibetan given name meaning "wisdom"
Yishai (name) or Yeshay, a Hebrew given name

See also
Jesse, father of the biblical David